Diego Gerardo Calvo Fonseca (born 25 March 1991) is a Costa Rican professional footballer who plays as a winger.

Club career
A leftsided winger, Calvo started his career at Alajuelense and joined Vålerenga in March 2013 to play alongside compatriot Giancarlo González. On 11 August 2014, he was loaned out to IFK Göteborg.

International
Calvo played for his country at the 2011 FIFA U-20 World Cup.

He made his senior debut for Costa Rica on 22 March 2013 against the United States in the 2014 FIFA World Cup qualifiers at Dick's Sporting Goods Park in Colorado and has, as of January 2014, earned a total of 8 caps, scoring one goal. He has represented his country in 6 FIFA World Cup qualification matches.

International goals
Scores and results list. Costa Rica's goal tally first.

References

External links 
 
 

1991 births
Living people
Footballers from San José, Costa Rica
Association football wingers
Costa Rican footballers
Costa Rica international footballers
L.D. Alajuelense footballers
Vålerenga Fotball players
Liga FPD players
Eliteserien players
IFK Göteborg players
Allsvenskan players
Costa Rican expatriate footballers
Expatriate footballers in Norway
Expatriate footballers in Sweden
Costa Rican expatriate sportspeople in Norway
2014 FIFA World Cup players
Real Monarchs players